Lucas Steele is an American stage actor best known for his role as Anatole   in Natasha, Pierre & The Great Comet of 1812.

Early life
Steele was raised in Wyalusing, Pennsylvania. He began learning piano by ear at age 3, and violin at age 11.

Career 
Steele made his Broadway debut in the 2006 revival of The Threepenny Opera, playing the ensemble roles of Harry and Velma while understudying the role of Lucy Brown.

In the fall of 2006, Steele was signed to a four-year development deal for a commercial music project. For the next four years he focused on writing, producing, conceiving and developing a conceptualized electro/rock/pop album while traveling throughout Europe. While working on the album, Steele originated roles in the world premieres of Neil Bartlett's adaptation of Oliver Twist (presented by Theatre for a New Audience Off-Broadway in 2007) and It's Only Life (premiering at the Rubicon Theatre Company in Ventura in 2008).

In 2009, he returned to the West Coast, cast in Theatre For A New Audience's critically acclaimed production of Othello at the Intiman Theater in Seattle, WA.

In 2010, after participating in two years of developmental readings, Steele originated the role of Terry in The New Group production of The Kid, based on the best selling novel by writer/author/activist Dan Savage. After completing its run, Steele returned to Europe, entering the last chapter of the fated music project, ultimately leaving the deal in February 2011. Steele took the next year off to develop several screenplays as a writer.

In February 2012, Steele originated the role of "the Son'" in the critically acclaimed production of Myths and Hymns, presented off-Broadway by the Prospect Theater Company.

In summer 2012, Steele was cast as Anatole  in the Ars Nova developmental reading/workshop of Natasha, Pierre & The Great Comet of 1812, a sung-through musical based on a portion of Leo Tolstoy's magnum opus, War and Peace. He further developed the role in the show's premiere, and stayed with the production through its venues at Kazino, both downtown in the Meatpacking District and its transfer to midtown on 45th street. In 2015, Steele reprised the role of Anatole for the American Repertory Theatre production of The Great Comet, securing an IRNE Awards nomination for Supporting Actor and an Elliot Norton Awards nomination for Outstanding Musical Performance by an Actor. He continued with The Great Comet during its Broadway run at the Imperial Theatre, starting in November 2016. He is one of only two actors who have stayed with the production since its debut at Ars Nova in 2012.

In spring 2014, Steele booked the role of Luca Bavarra in the ABC pilot Dangerous Liaisons. Later that year, he shot the short film Photo. 

At the time of the 2020 New York City theater shutdown amidst the COViD-19 pandemic, Steele was appearing as Skull, the primary antagonist in the musical Emojiland.  The show which opened on Off-Broadway at the Duke Theater on January 19, 2020, had its imminent closing expedited by the coronavirus outbreak. Steele's portrayal of Skull was described by Laura Collins-Hughes in the New York Times as "deathly pale in black leather and mesh, and oozing an almost Victorian dark charisma."

Stage credits

Theatre credits

Awards and nominations

References

External links

21st-century American male actors
American male musical theatre actors
American male stage actors
Living people
Year of birth missing (living people)